In engineering, applied mathematics, and physics, the Buckingham  theorem is a key theorem in dimensional analysis.  It is a formalization of Rayleigh's method of dimensional analysis. Loosely, the theorem states that if there is a physically meaningful equation involving a certain number n of physical variables, then the original equation can be rewritten in terms of a set of p = n − k dimensionless parameters 1, 2, ..., p constructed from the original variables, where k is the number of physical dimensions involved; it is obtained as the rank of a particular matrix.

The theorem provides a method for computing sets of dimensionless parameters from the given variables, or nondimensionalization, even if the form of the equation is still unknown.

The Buckingham  theorem indicates that validity of the laws of physics does not depend on a specific unit system. A statement of this theorem is that any physical law can be expressed as an identity involving only dimensionless combinations (ratios or products) of the variables linked by the law (for example, pressure and volume are linked by Boyle's law – they are inversely proportional). If the dimensionless combinations' values changed with the systems of units, then the equation would not be an identity, and the theorem would not hold.

History 

Although named for Edgar Buckingham, the  theorem was first proved by the French mathematician Joseph Bertrand in 1878. Bertrand considered only special cases of problems from electrodynamics and heat conduction, but his article contains, in distinct terms, all the basic ideas of the modern proof of the theorem and clearly indicates the theorem's utility for modelling physical phenomena. The technique of using the theorem ("the method of dimensions") became widely known due to the works of Rayleigh. The first application of the  theorem in the general case to the dependence of pressure drop in a pipe upon governing parameters probably dates back to 1892, a heuristic proof with the use of series expansions, to 1894.

It was Buckingham's article that introduced the use of the symbol "" for the dimensionless variables (or parameters), and this is the source of the theorem's name.

Statement 
For experimental purposes, different systems that share the same description in terms of these dimensionless numbers are equivalent.

In mathematical terms, if we have a physically meaningful equation such as

where  are any  physical variables, and there is a maximal dimensionally independent subset of size , then the above equation can be restated as

where the exponents  are rational numbers. (They can always be taken to be integers by redefining  as being raised to a power that clears all denominators.) If there are  fundamental units in play, then .

Significance 
The Buckingham  theorem provides a method for computing sets of dimensionless parameters from given variables, even if the form of the equation remains unknown. However, the choice of dimensionless parameters is not unique; Buckingham's theorem only provides a way of generating sets of dimensionless parameters and does not indicate the most "physically meaningful".

Two systems for which these parameters coincide are called similar (as with similar triangles, they differ only in scale); they are equivalent for the purposes of the equation, and the experimentalist who wants to determine the form of the equation can choose the most convenient one. Most importantly, Buckingham's theorem describes the relation between the number of variables and fundamental dimensions.

Proof 

For simplicity, it will be assumed that the space of fundamental and derived physical units forms a vector space over the real numbers, with the fundamental units as basis vectors, and with multiplication of physical units as the "vector addition" operation, and raising to powers as the "scalar multiplication" operation:
represent a dimensional variable as the set of exponents needed for the fundamental units (with a power of zero if the particular fundamental unit is not present). We could also require that exponents of the fundamental units be rational numbers and modify the proof accordingly, in which case the exponents in the pi groups can always be taken as rational numbers or even integers.

Rescaling units 
Suppose we have quantities , where the units of  contain length raised to the power . Any physically meaningful law should be invariant under an arbitrary rescaling of every fundamental unit; this is the fact that the pi theorem hinges on.

Formal proof 
Given a system of  dimensional variables  in  fundamental (basis) dimensions, the dimensional matrix is the  matrix  whose  rows correspond to the fundamental dimensions and whose  columns are the dimensions of the variables: the th entry (where  and ) is the power of the th fundamental dimension in the th variable. 
The matrix can be interpreted as taking in a combination of the variable quantities and giving out the dimensions of the combination in terms of the fundamental dimensions.

consists of the units of

in terms of the  fundamental independent (basis) units.

We define a physical law to be an arbitrary function  such that  is a permissible set of values for the physical system when . We further require  to be invariant under this action. Hence it descends to a function .

That is, we have an exact sequence

Taking tranposes yields another exact sequence

The International System of Units defines seven base units, which are the ampere, kelvin, second, metre, kilogram, candela and mole. It is sometimes advantageous to introduce additional base units and techniques to refine the technique of dimensional analysis. (See orientational analysis and reference.)

Examples

Speed 
This example is elementary but serves to demonstrate the procedure.

Suppose a car is driving at 100 km/h; how long does it take to go 200 km?

This question considers  dimensioned variables: distance  time  and speed  and we are seeking some law of the form  Any two of these variables are dimensionally independent, but the three taken together are not. Thus there is  dimensionless quantity.

The dimensional matrix is

The elements of the matrix correspond to the powers to which the respective dimensions are to be raised. For instance, the third column  states that  represented by the column vector  is expressible in terms of the basis dimensions as  since 

For a dimensionless constant  we are looking for vectors  such that the matrix-vector product  equals the zero vector  In linear algebra, the set of vectors with this property is known as the kernel (or nullspace) of the dimensional matrix. In this particular case its kernel is one-dimensional. The dimensional matrix as written above is in reduced row echelon form, so one can read off a non-zero kernel vector to within a multiplicative constant:

If the dimensional matrix were not already reduced, one could perform Gauss–Jordan elimination on the dimensional matrix to more easily determine the kernel. It follows that the dimensionless constant, replacing the dimensions by the corresponding dimensioned variables, may be written:

Since the kernel is only defined to within a multiplicative constant, the above dimensionless constant raised to any arbitrary power yields another (equivalent) dimensionless constant.

Dimensional analysis has thus provided a general equation relating the three physical variables:

or, letting  denote a zero of function 

which can be written in the desired form (which recall was ) as

The actual relationship between the three variables is simply  In other words, in this case  has one physically relevant root, and it is unity. The fact that only a single value of  will do and that it is equal to 1 is not revealed by the technique of dimensional analysis.

The simple pendulum
We wish to determine the period  of small oscillations in a simple pendulum. It will be assumed that it is a function of the length  the mass  and the acceleration due to gravity on the surface of the Earth  which has dimensions of length divided by time squared. The model is of the form

(Note that it is written as a relation, not as a function:  is not written here as a function of )

Period, mass, and length are dimensionally independent, but acceleration can be expressed in terms of time and length, which means the four variables taken together are not dimensionally independent.

where  is given by

for some values of 

The dimensions of the dimensional quantities are:

The dimensional matrix is:

Were it not already reduced, one could perform Gauss–Jordan elimination on the dimensional matrix to more easily determine the kernel. It follows that the dimensionless constant may be written:

In fundamental terms:

which is dimensionless. Since the kernel is only defined to within a multiplicative constant, if the above dimensionless constant is raised to any arbitrary power, it will yield another equivalent dimensionless constant.

In this example, three of the four dimensional quantities are fundamental units, so the last (which is ) must be a combination of the previous. 
Note that if  (the coefficient of ) had been non-zero then there would be no way to cancel the  value; therefore   be zero. Dimensional analysis has allowed us to conclude that the period of the pendulum is not a function of its mass  (In the 3D space of powers of mass, time, and distance, we can say that the vector for mass is linearly independent from the vectors for the three other variables. Up to a scaling factor,  is the only nontrivial way to construct a vector of a dimensionless parameter.)

The model can now be expressed as:

Then this implies that  for some zero  of the function  If there is only one zero, call it  then  It requires more physical insight or an experiment to show that there is indeed only one zero and that the constant is in fact given by 

For large oscillations of a pendulum, the analysis is complicated by an additional dimensionless parameter, the maximum swing angle. The above analysis is a good approximation as the angle approaches zero.

Other examples

An example of dimensional analysis can be found for the case of the mechanics of a thin, solid and parallel-sided rotating disc.  There are five variables involved which reduce to two non-dimensional groups. The relationship between these can be determined by numerical experiment using, for example, the finite element method.

The theorem has also been used in fields other than physics, for instance in sports science.

See also

 Blast wave
 Dimensionless quantity
 Natural units
 Similitude (model)
 Reynolds number

References

Notes

Citations

Bibliography

Original sources

External links
 Some reviews and original sources on the history of pi theorem and the theory of similarity (in Russian)

Articles containing proofs
Dimensional analysis
Physics theorems